David Bissett (born September 26, 1979) is a Canadian bobsledder who has competed since 2005. Competing in three Winter Olympics, he won a bronze medal in the four-man event at Vancouver in the 2010 Winter Olympics.

He won a silver medal in the four-man event at the 2007 FIBT World Championships in St. Moritz.

Bissett was born in Lethbridge, Alberta, and starred in Canadian football at the University of Alberta in Edmonton. He now resides in Okotoks.

External links
 David Bissett at Bobsleigh Canada Skeleton
 
 
 
 

1979 births
Living people
Alberta Golden Bears football players
Bobsledders at the 2006 Winter Olympics
Bobsledders at the 2010 Winter Olympics
Bobsledders at the 2014 Winter Olympics
Canadian male bobsledders
Medalists at the 2010 Winter Olympics
Olympic bobsledders of Canada
Olympic bronze medalists for Canada
Olympic medalists in bobsleigh
Players of Canadian football from Alberta
Sportspeople from Lethbridge